Saint-Omer-Capelle is a commune in the Pas-de-Calais department in the Hauts-de-France region of France.

Geography
Saint-Omer-Capelle is located some 8 miles (13 km) to the east of Calais on the D229 road and just a few hundred yards from the A16 autoroute.

Population

Places of interest
 The church of St.Omer, dating from the eighteenth century.

See also
Communes of the Pas-de-Calais department

References

Saintomercapelle